In mathematics, the lower convex envelope  of a function  defined on an interval  is defined at each point of the interval as the supremum of all convex functions that lie under that function, i.e.

See also 
 Convex hull
 Lower envelope

Convex analysis